House of Assembly elections were held on 24 November 1980 to elect the twelve members of the Tobago House of Assembly. The Democratic Action Congress won eight seats with 53.14% of the vote, while the People's National Movement won four seats with 44.65% of the vote.

Results

Notes

References

Tobago
Local elections in Trinidad and Tobago
1980 in Trinidad and Tobago